The deepbody bitterling or Itasenpara bitterling (''Acheilognathus longipinnis') is a species of freshwater fish in the family of Cyprinidae. It is endemic to central and southern Japan. It grows to a maximum length of 8.0 cm.

References

Acheilognathus
Fish described in 1905
Freshwater fish of Japan
Taxonomy articles created by Polbot